Loiza Lamers (born 9 January 1995) is a Dutch model and businesswoman best known for being the winner of the eighth cycle of Holland's Next Top Model, and the world's first transgender winner of the global Top Model TV-franchise.

Early life
Lamers, a Gelderland native, was born in Driel in 1995. Lamers expressed her gender nonconformity early in life, beginning her gender transition early in her childhood. At the age of 10, Lamers was featured in a 2005 documentary by Charlotte Hoogakker titled Van Lucas naar Luus (From Lucas to Luus), which focused on her transition. Lamers underwent Sex reassignment surgery at the age of 18, two years before her appearance on the Dutch adaptation of Top Model.

Holland's Next Top Model
Lamers worked as a hairdresser prior to auditioning for the eighth season of Holland's Next Top Model in early 2015. She was ultimately chosen as one of the final thirteen contestants.  Producers of the show were unaware of her status as a trans woman until she disclosed the information after rumors circulated on the internet.

On 26 October 2015 Lamers was voted the winner of the competition by the Dutch public in the show's live finale. Her prizes included a modelling contract valued at €50,000, which she rejected.

In 2019 Lamers was guest jury member in the twelfth season of Holland's Next Top Model.

January 2020, Lamers was confirmed to be one of the contestants on Let's Dance Germany 2020
she was eliminated in week 7 after having done Paso Doble to "Rhythm Is a Dancer", and been part of Team Gonzalez for the group dance to "Vogue" and "Push the Feeling On".

Performances in Let's Dance Germany (paired with Andrzej Cibis) 

In 2021, she appeared in the television show De Verraders. In 2022, she appeared in the television show The Masked Singer.

Performances in The Masked Singer

References

External links

1995 births
Living people
Dutch female models
Next Top Model winners
People from Overbetuwe
Transgender female models
Transgender women
Dutch transgender people
Dutch LGBT businesspeople
Dutch LGBT entertainers
21st-century Dutch businesswomen
21st-century Dutch businesspeople